Twinings is a British marketer of tea and other beverages, including coffee, hot chocolate and malt drinks, based in Andover, Hampshire. The brand is owned by Associated British Foods. It holds the world's oldest continually used company logo, and is London's longest-standing ratepayer, having occupied the same premises on the Strand since 1706. Twinings tea varieties include black tea, green tea and herbal teas, along with fruit-based cold infusions.

History 
Twinings was founded by Thomas Twining, of Painswick, Gloucestershire, England, who opened Britain's first known tea room, at No. 216 Strand, London, in 1706; it still operates today. The firm's logo, created in 1787, is the world's oldest in continuous use.

Holder of a royal warrant, Twinings was acquired by Associated British Foods in 1964. The company is associated with Earl Grey tea, a tea infused with bergamot, though it is unclear when this association began, and how important the company's involvement with the tea has been. Competitor Jacksons of Piccadilly – acquired by Twinings during the 1990s – also had associations with the bergamot blend.

In April 2008, Twinings announced their decision to close its Belfast Nambarrie plant, a tea company in trade for over 140 years. Citing an "efficiency drive", Twinings moved most of its production to China and Poland in late 2011, while retaining its Andover, Hampshire factory with a reduced workforce.

Ethics
Twinings' ethical tea programme, Sourced with Care, aims to improve the quality of life in the communities from which it buys tea. The company is a founding member of the Ethical Tea Partnership, a not-for-profit membership organisation of tea-packing companies which undertake monitoring and improving conditions on tea estates in all major tea-growing regions. Twinings has an Ethical Code of Conduct and works with all its packaging and raw material suppliers to ensure decent working conditions in the supply chain.

In August 2018, Twinings published a list of all its tea suppliers in India on its Sourced with Care website. This came after Traidcraft Exchange called on all the major UK tea brands to show the public which tea plantations they buy from and crack down on modern slavery in the supply chain. Traidcraft Exchange welcomed the move, their policy adviser, Fiona Gooch, saying that it would put "pressure on the other big tea brands ... to follow suit".

Notable members of the Twining family
 Thomas Twining (1675–1741), tea merchant, Twinings founder
Mary Twining (1726-1804), tea merchant, mother of Richard Twining
 Thomas Twining (1735–1804), classical scholar
 Richard Twining (1749–1824), tea merchant
 William Twining (1790-1835), military physician
 Elizabeth Twining (1805–1889), botanical illustrator
 Louisa Twining (1820–1912), social reformer
 Edward Twining (1899–1967), diplomat

See also

Brooke Bond
Lipton
PG Tips
Tata Tea
Tea
Tetley
Typhoo tea
Yorkshire Tea
Dilmah

References

External links

Official British website
Official Canadian website
Official American website
Official Australian website
Interview with Stephen Twining (September 2006) The Citizen, South Africa

1706 establishments in England
Andover, Hampshire
Tea brands in the United Kingdom
Companies based in Hampshire
British Royal Warrant holders
Associated British Foods brands
Companies established in 1706
Twining family
Strand, London